Matalom (IPA: [mɐ'talom]), officially the Municipality of Matalom, is a 3rd class municipality in the province of Leyte, Philippines. According to the 2020 census, it has a population of 32,586 people.

Etymology
It was said that the Spaniards once saw the flaming red of the flame trees that dotted the shores of Matalom Beach and the scenic Canigao Island and asked the natives the local dialect for "hermosa" or beautiful. The natives answered "Matahum" or "Matalom." This was the origin of the town's name.

History
Before Ferdinand Magellan discovered the Philippines, a sea-faring people lived along the banks of the Matalom River and also on the islet of Canigao (formerly Comigao).

In the middle of the 19th century, the townspeople of Matalom constructed their own parish church, convent, school, and public buildings through their own efforts. These were all accomplished with the leadership of Spanish Friar Leonardo Celes Diaz and Capitan Calixto Pil believed to be the founder and first president of the town.

Leadership in the town's administration may be divided into three regimes: Spanish, American and Postwar (Philippine Independence). The first president of Matalom during the Spanish regime was Capitan Calixto Pil. Succession to the chair of president was patterned after the original dynasty set up by the natives, by Pal and Pil families. Thus, after Kapitan "Itong" (Cpt. Calixto Pil) his son followed. Next in line was Kapitan "Osting" (Cpt. Agustin Pil) then Kapitan "Kulas" (Cpt. Nicolas Pal), then Kapitan "Bentoy" (Cpt. Ruberto Pal), the last president before the transition period from Spanish to American regimes. The council members were then called, "Guinhaupan," acknowledged leader in settlements, now barrios or sitios.

The transition from the American regime to the time the Philippines obtained its independence saw Jeremias Pal re-elected alcalde in 1937 until the outbreak of World War II. The dark days of the Japanese occupation had Antonio Olo as the "puppet mayor". The restoration of the civil government after the war saw the appointment of Primitivo Gopo as the municipal mayor of Matalom.

Geography

Barangays
Matalom is politically subdivided into 30 barangays.

Climate

Demographics

Economy

Tourism
Matalom has become famous for Canigao Island.

References

External links

 [ Philippine Standard Geographic Code]
Philippine Census Information
Local Governance Performance Management System

Municipalities of Leyte (province)